Reil may refer to:

Reil (surname)
Reil, Germany, a municipality in Rhineland-Palatinate, Germany
Island of Reil, the insular cortex of the mammalian brain
Runway end identifier lights, abbreviated REIL

People with the given name
 Reil Cervantes (born 1986), Filipino professional basketball player